

Na 
 Richard Nadeau b. 1959 first elected in 2006 as Bloc Québécois member for Gatineau, Quebec. 
 Joseph-Célestin Nadon b. 1899 first elected in 1949 as Liberal member for Gatineau, Quebec.
 Guillaume-Alphonse Nantel b. 1852 first elected in 1882 as Conservative member for Terrebonne, Quebec.
 Pierre Nantel b. 1963 first elected in 2011 as New Democratic Party member for Longueuil—Pierre-Boucher, Quebec.
 Wilfrid Bruno Nantel b. 1857 first elected in 1908 as Conservative member for Terrebonne, Quebec.
Yasir Naqvi b. 1973 first elected in 2021 as Liberal member for Ottawa Centre, Ontario. 
Peggy Nash b. 1951 first elected in 2006 as New Democratic Party member for Parkdale—High Park, Ontario. 
 Edward Nasserden b. 1919 first elected in 1958 as Progressive Conservative member for Rosthern, Saskatchewan.
 Eva Nassif first elected in 2015 as Liberal member for Vimy, Quebec.
 John Nater b. 1984 first elected in 2015 as Conservative member for Perth—Wellington, Ontario.
 Henry Nathan b. 1842 first elected in 1871 as Liberal member for Victoria, British Columbia.
 Bob Nault b. 1955 first elected in 1988 as Liberal member for Kenora—Rainy River, Ontario.

Ne 

 Paddy Neale b. 1921 first elected in 1972 as New Democratic Party member for Vancouver East, British Columbia.
 Joseph Needham b. 1876 first elected in 1935 as Social Credit member for The Battlefords, Saskatchewan.
 David Bradley Neely b. 1873 first elected in 1908 as Liberal member for Humboldt, Saskatchewan.
 Doug Neil b. 1924 first elected in 1972 as Progressive Conservative member for Moose Jaw, Saskatchewan.
 Alan Webster Neill b. 1868 first elected in 1921 as Progressive member for Comox—Alberni, British Columbia.
 Hugh Nelson b. 1830 first elected in 1871 as Liberal-Conservative member for New Westminster District, British Columbia.
 Nels Nelson b. 1917   first elected in 1972 as New Democratic Party member for Burnaby—Seymour, British Columbia.
 Edward Walter Nesbitt b. 1859 first elected in 1908 as Liberal member for Oxford North, Ontario.
 Wally Nesbitt b. 1918 first elected in 1953 as Progressive Conservative member for Oxford, Ontario.
 Eli Nesdoly b. 1931 first elected in 1972 as New Democratic Party member for Meadow Lake, Saskatchewan.
 Hilaire Neveu b. 1839 first elected in 1889 as Nationalist member for Joliette, Quebec.
 Louis-Paul Neveu b. 1931 first elected in 1965 as Liberal member for Shefford, Quebec.
 Anita Neville b. 1942 first elected in 2000 as Liberal member for Winnipeg South Centre, Manitoba.

Ng 

 Mary Ng b. 1968 first elected in 2017 as Liberal member for Markham-Thornhill

Ni 
 Jamie Nicholls b. 1971 first elected in 2011 as New Democratic Party member for Vaudreuil—Soulanges, Quebec.
 Aideen Nicholson b. 1927 first elected in 1974 as Liberal member for Trinity, Ontario.
 Alexander Malcolm Nicholson b. 1900 first elected in 1940 as Cooperative Commonwealth Federation member for Mackenzie, Saskatchewan.
 Donald Nicholson b. 1850 first elected in 1911 as Conservative member for Queen's, Prince Edward Island.
 George Brecken Nicholson b. 1868 first elected in 1917 as Unionist member for Algoma East, Ontario.
 John Robert Nicholson b. 1901 first elected in 1962 as Liberal member for Vancouver Centre, British Columbia.
 Robert Douglas Nicholson b. 1952 first elected in 1984 as Progressive Conservative member for Niagara Falls, Ontario.
 Dave Nickerson b. 1944 first elected in 1979 as Progressive Conservative member for Western Arctic, Northwest Territories.
 Carl Olof Nickle b. 1914 first elected in 1951 as Progressive Conservative member for Calgary West, Alberta.
 William Folger Nickle b. 1869 first elected in 1911 as Conservative member for Kingston, Ontario.
 Dorise Winifred Nielsen b. 1902 first elected in 1940 as Unity member for North Battleford, Saskatchewan.
 Erik Nielsen b. 1924 first elected in 1957 as Progressive Conservative member for Yukon, Yukon.
 George E. Nixon b. 1898 first elected in 1940 as Liberal member for Algoma West, Ontario.

No 

 Percy Verner Noble 1902-1996, first elected in 1957 as Progressive Conservative member for Grey North, Ontario.
 Aurélien Noël b. 1904 first elected in 1967 as Liberal member for Outremont—St-Jean, Quebec.
Taleeb Noormohamed first elected in 2021 as Liberal member for Vancouver Granville, British Columbia. 
 Rick Norlock b. 1948 first elected in 2006 as Conservative member for Northumberland—Quinte West, Ontario. 
 Gilbert Normand b. 1943 first elected in 1997 as Liberal member for Bellechasse—Etchemins—Montmagny—L'Islet, Quebec.
 Christine Normandin first elected in 2019 as Bloc Québécois member for Saint-Jean, Quebec. 
 James Norris b. 1809 first elected in 1874 as Liberal member for Lincoln, Ontario.
 William Barton Northrup b. 1856 first elected in 1892 as Conservative member for Hastings East, Ontario.
 Joseph William Noseworthy b. 1888 first elected in 1942 as Cooperative Commonwealth Federation member for York South, Ontario.
 George Clyde Nowlan b. 1898 first elected in 1948 as Progressive Conservative member for Digby—Annapolis—Kings, Nova Scotia.
 Pat Nowlan b. 1931 first elected in 1965 as Progressive Conservative member for Digby—Annapolis—Kings, Nova Scotia.

Nu 

 Terry Nugent b. 1920 first elected in 1958 as Progressive Conservative member for Edmonton—Strathcona, Alberta.
 Osvaldo Nunez b. 1938 first elected in 1993 as Bloc Québécois member for Bourassa, Quebec.
 José Núñez-Melo b. 1956 first elected in 2011 as New Democratic Party member for Laval, Quebec. 
 John Nunziata b. 1955 first elected in 1984 as Liberal member for York South—Weston, Ontario.
 Alex Nuttall b. 1985 first elected in 2015 as Conservative member for Barrie—Springwater—Oro-Medonte, Ontario.

Ny 

 Terry Nylander b. 1946 first elected in 1979 as Progressive Conservative member for The Battlefords—Meadow Lake, Saskatchewan.
 Lorne Nystrom b. 1946 first elected in 1968 as New Democratic Party member for Yorkton—Melville, Saskatchewan.

N